is a moth of the family Oecophoridae. It is known from New South Wales, Queensland and Victoria.

Adults have rusty brown forewings with a central white dot and a thin gray diagonal stripe across the margin.

The larvae feed on the green leaves or branchlets of Exocarpos cupressiformis, Hakea species (including Hakea sericea) and introduced Juniperus species (including Juniperus hybernica) and Pinus species (including Pinus radiata, Pinus pinaster and Pinus elliottii). They tie green branchlets or leaves with silk.

References

Oecophorinae
Moths described in 1883